Bahler, Bähler or Baehler is a surname. Notable people with the surname include:

 Liane Bahler (1982–2007), German cyclist
 John Bahler (born 1940), American musician
 Tom Bahler (born 1943), American musician
 Heidi Zeller-Bähler (born 1967), Swiss alpine skier